Pyrrorhiza is a genus of herbs in the family Haemodoraceae, first described as a genus in 1957. It contains only one known species, Pyrrorhiza neblinae, endemic to the Sierra de la Neblina in Amazonas State, Venezuela.

References

Haemodoraceae
Monotypic Commelinales genera
Endemic flora of Venezuela